A list of books and essays about Alfred Hitchcock:

Individual films

Vertigo (1958)

''Psycho'' (1960)

Hitchcock, Alfred
Bibliography